The 4th National Film Awards, then known as State Awards for Films, presented by Ministry of Information and Broadcasting, India to felicitate the best of Indian Cinema released in the year 1956. Ceremony took place at Vigyan Bhavan, New Delhi on 28 April 1957 and awards were given by then President of India, Dr. Rajendra Prasad.

Awards 

Awards were divided into feature films and non-feature films.

President's gold medal for the All India Best Feature Film is now better known as National Film Award for Best Feature Film, whereas President's gold medal for the Best Documentary Film is analogous to today's National Film Award for Best Non-Feature Film. For children's films, Prime Minister's gold medal is now given as National Film Award for Best Children's Film. At the regional level, President's silver medal for Best Feature Film is now given as National Film Award for Best Feature Film in a particular language. Certificate of Merit in all the categories is discontinued over the years.

Feature films 

Feature films were awarded at All India as well as regional level. For the 4th National Film Awards, in this category, Kabuliwala, a Bengali film, along with a Telugu film, Tenali Ramakrishna won the maximum number of awards (two), with former also winning the President's gold medal for the All India Best Feature Film. Following were the awards given:

All India Award 

For 4th National Film Awards, none of the films were awarded from Children's films category as no film was found to be suitable. Only Certificate of Merit for Children's films was given. Following were the awards given in each category:

Regional Award 

The awards were given to the best films made in the regional languages of India. For 4th National Film Awards, President's silver medal for Best Feature Film was not given in Hindi, Kannada and Tamil language; instead Certificate of Merit was awarded in each particular language, whereas no award was given for Assamese, Malayalam and Marathi language films.

Non-Feature films 

Non-feature film awards were given for the documentaries made in the country. Following were the awards given:

Documentaries

Awards not given 

Following were the awards not given as no film was found to be suitable for the award:

 Prime Minister's gold medal for the Best Children's Film
 President's silver medal for Best Feature Film in Assamese
 President's silver medal for Best Feature Film in Hindi
 President's silver medal for Best Feature Film in Kannada
 President's silver medal for Best Feature Film in Malayalam
 President's silver medal for Best Feature Film in Marathi
 President's silver medal for Best Feature Film in Tamil

References

External links 
 National Film Awards Archives
 Official Page for Directorate of Film Festivals, India

National Film Awards (India) ceremonies
1957 in Indian cinema
1957 film awards